Richard D.  "Rick" Orman  (born June 9, 1948) is a businessman and former Canadian politician. Orman was born in Calgary, Alberta in 1948 as a fourth generation Albertan. He studied at the University of Calgary before graduating with honours from Eastern Washington University in 1971. Orman served as a member of the Legislative Assembly of Alberta from 1986 to 1993. Since 1993, he has been active within the business community, both provincially and internationally.

Orman first became a member of the Canadian Association of Petroleum Landmen in 1972 and has provided provincial and federal political commentary on the Canadian Broadcast Corporation (CBC) and the CKUA Radio Network since 1994.

Early career: 1975–1983
Following the formation of the first Peter Lougheed Progressive Conservative government in 1971, Orman served as executive assistant to two successive Alberta energy and resources ministers from 1972 to 1975.

In 1977, Orman co-founded Orman & Benini Land Services (subsequently Canadian Landmasters Resource Services). In 1979, he joined Signalta Resources Ltd., a joint venture partnership where he served as manager of land and contracts until 1982. In 1982 he founded Nexus Resources Ltd., a private Calgary-based exploration company.

From 1980 to 1985, Orman was non-operating partner of the board for CorpSport International Inc., an Edmonton-based sports management firm.

Political career
In 1983 Orman ran unsuccessfully for the Federal Progressive Conservative nomination in Calgary Centre, finishing second to incumbent Harvie Andre. At the time it was one of the largest nominations in Canadian PC party history, with more than 3,200 ballots cast.

In 1985 Orman was a senior Calgary organizer for the successful Don Getty provincial PC leadership campaign.

IN 1986 he was unopposed as candidate for the PC Party, and acclaimed as its candidate, for the new constituency of Calgary Montrose. He served Calgary Montrose in the Alberta Legislature from 1986 until his retirement from elected politics in 1993.

In 1992 Orman ran in a field of nine candidates for the Progressive Conservative leadership and placed third to future Liberal leader Nancy Betkowski and eventual winner Ralph Klein. Orman received 7,649 votes on the first ballot. Orman withdrew from the race prior to the final ballot. Klein won on the final ballot.

In 2011 he again ran for the leadership of the PC party. Although he did not make it to the 2nd ballot his campaign contributed to an important dialogue regarding centre right politics in Alberta.

In July 2011 Orman was selected by Alberta Venture Magazine as one of Alberta's 50 Most Influential People.

Orman served as president of the Calgary Centre Federal Conservative Association from February 2014 to May 2015.

In the wake of the NDP victory in Alberta May 5, 2015, Orman was a co-organizer of the first "unite the right" Alberta conservative movement held in Red Deer on February 19, 2016 (February 19 Committee). https://calgaryherald.com/news/politics/tory-insider-rick-orman-says-plans-to-unite-conservatives-in-alberta-are-progressing. The committee followed up with an open assembly of province-wide small "c" conservatives concerned with vote splitting by the two right of centre parties (PC's and Wild Rose). The first assembly was held April 30 at Red Deer College and more than 500 conservatives attended. In July 2017, The two parties announced the merger to form the United Conservative Party.

The Premier of Alberta and Leader of the United Conservative Party of Alberta Jason Kenney resigned on 19 May 2022. On June 18, 2022 Orman was appointed Chief Returning Officer for the party's selection process of a new leader and Premier. https://www.unitedconservative.ca/rick-orman-named-returning-officer-for-the-ucp-leadership-election/

June 18, 2022 the Leadership Election Committee (LEC) of the United Conservative Party appointed former MLA and Cabinet Minister Rick Orman as Chief Returning Officer for its leadership vote October 6, 2022. https://www.unitedconservative.ca/rick-orman-named-returning-officer-for-the-ucp-leadership-election/

Legislative career: 1986–1993
Elected to the Alberta Legislature in May 1986, Orman held three Cabinet portfolios.

Orman served the constituency of Calgary Montrose for the Progressive Conservatives from 1986 to 1993.

Minister of Career Development and Employment: 1986–1988 
Following his election in 1986, Orman was appointed the Minister of Career Development and Employment, where he served until September 1988. He was also responsible for lotteries, exhibitions and fairs, and served as a member of the Economic Planning Cabinet Committee.

As Career Development and Employment Minister, Orman developed and implemented the Labour Market Strategy, Community Facilities Enhancement Program and the Employment Alternatives Program which aided social assistance recipients in entering the job market. He also established the Immigration and Settlement Services Advisory Council and opened a Business Immigration Office in Hong Kong, where he led two investment missions to Southeast Asia.

Minister of Labour: 1988–1989 
In September 1988, Orman was appointed Minister of Labour, a position he held until March 1989. As Labour Minister, he was responsible for the Department of Labour, the Alberta Labour Relations Board and the Personnel Administration Office. During his tenure, Orman was responsible for the Human Rights Commission and implemented major changes to the Labour Relations Code.

He served as vice-chairman of the Labour Relations Committee and also served on the Priorities, Finance and Coordination Committee of Cabinet.

Minister of Energy: 1989–1992 
From 1989 to 1992, Orman served as Minister of Energy, where he was responsible for the Department of Energy, Energy Resources Conservation Board, Alberta Oil Sands Equity, Alberta Petroleum Marketing Commission, Public Utilities Board, and Alberta Oil Sands Technology and Research Authority.

During this time, Orman was appointed chairman of Energy Committee and chairman of Economic Planning Committee of Cabinet, and continued to serve on the Priorities, Finance and Coordination Committee of Cabinet. Additionally, Orman was instrumental in the establishment of the Natural Resources Conservation Board and served as a member of the treasury board. As chairman of Economic Planning Committee, Orman played a lead role in planning and organizing Towards 2000 Together – a province-wide consultative initiative that sought public input into how Alberta could prepare for, and prosper in, the decade ahead.

Orman led many of Alberta's energy negotiations and took part in frequent speaking engagements on both national and international stages. During his tenure, natural gas pipeline expansion to the United States was a primary focus. As Minister of Energy he was actively involved in the natural gas contract dispute between Alberta producers and California. He also played a leading role in organizing and co-chairing the first federal-provincial energy and environment ministers joint meeting on climate change held in Kananaskis, Alberta.

In 1991, he was awarded the prestigious Crossborder Award as the person who played the most significant role in enhancing natural gas trade between Canada and the United States.

In 1992 Orman oversaw significant revisions to the Alberta Royalty regime, making the royalty price sensitive and more competitive in a changing world environment.

As Minister of Energy, Orman served as a delegate to the Organization of the Petroleum Exporting Countries (OPEC), the United States Interstate Oil and Gas Compact Commission, and the South West Energy Council. Additionally, Orman was a founding member of the Clean Air Strategic Alliance – a group dedicated to managing a clean air environment.  He also led energy related trade missions to Asia, the Middle East and Europe.

Career following political service: 1993-present 
Since Orman's return to the private sector, he has remained active as an officer and board member in a number of privately held and publicly traded companies.

From 1994 to 1998, Orman founded and served as chairman and CEO of Kappa Energy Company Inc., an international energy exploration company active in Yemen, Columbia and Egypt. In 1999, Kappa merged with Vanguard Oil Corporation, where Orman sat on the board of directors until 2000. In April 2003, he co-founded Exceed Energy Inc. and served as vice-chairman until September 2005.  He was founder, director and chief executive of NOR Energy AS from 2005 to 2011, a private company with assets in the North Sea, Tanzania, Australia and Czech Republic. He was also board director of Novatel Inc. (NASDAQ) until its takeover in 2007.  Orman was a founding board director and former lead director of Daylight Energy Ltd. (TSX). Daylight was acquired by Sinopec International Petroleum Exploration and Production Corp (SIPC) and he continued as independent director of the Sinopec Daylight Energy Ltd. until July 2013. In November 2011 Orman was appointed by the Alberta Office of the Premier as senior advisor for the Northern Alberta Development Strategy. Orman is principal of PLM Consultants Ltd. Since September 2012 he has served as chairman of the board of WesCan Energy Corp, a company listed on the TSXV. From September, 2015 to September 2018, he was a consultant with Canadian Strategy Group as senior counsel. Orman was appointed as an independent non-executive director of Persta Resources Inc on April 26, 2016.  Mr. Orman is chairman of the remuneration committee and a member of the audit and risk committee of the board. On March 10, 2017, Persta completed its initial public offering and began trading on the main board of the Hong Kong Stock Exchange (HKEX).He is currently chairman of CannaPharmaRx, on the board of directors of Spoke Resources Ltd., and Acting CEO and Director of Surmont Resources Ltd.

Community involvement 
Orman has been deeply involved in the Alberta volunteer community beginning with the YWCA, where he worked with inner-city children as a teen.  Since then, he has been involved with the Calgary Chamber of Commerce, the Calgary Exhibition and Stampede, Citizen Advocacy for the Disabled and the Chrysalis Foundation for the Mentally and Physically Handicapped. He also coached Bantam and High School football in the Calgary area.

Additionally, Orman has been an honorary chairman for the Aga Khan Partnership Walk (Calgary, 1990 and 1991), Philippine Earthquake Disaster Relief Fund (Alberta, 1990), and the African Famine Relief (Alberta, 1992). Clean Air Strategic Award of Recognition as co-founder.

Honors and awards 
Eastern Washington University - Presidents Honor Roll 1971.

125th Anniversary of the Confederation of Canada Medal (1992) awarded to Canadians who were deemed to have made a significant contribution to their fellow citizens, to their community, or to Canada.

Queen's Platinum Jubilee Medal (2022) commemorating Her Majesty's 70th Anniversary as Monarch and is awarded to Albertans who have made a significant contribution to Canada and in particular to the Alberta region or community.

References

External links
Legislative Assembly of Alberta Members Listing
TSX

1948 births
Living people
Businesspeople from Calgary
Members of the Executive Council of Alberta
Politicians from Calgary
Progressive Conservative Association of Alberta MLAs